is a Japanese actor best known for his role as Don Dogoier/Gokai Green in the 2011 Super Sentai series Kaizoku Sentai Gokaiger. He was a member of the Naked Boyz acting troupe. He made his debut in 2008 for the 21st Junon Superboy Contest. He is currently affiliated with Flip Up.

Filmography

TV Drama
Kaizoku Sentai Gokaiger (2011–2012) - Don Dogoier/Gokai Green
Doubutsu Sentai Zyuohger (2016) - Don Dogoier/Gokai Green (Episodes 28 and 29)

Film
Gokusen: The Movie (2009)
2channel no Noroi (2010) - Keigo
Tensou Sentai Goseiger vs. Shinkenger: Epic on Ginmaku (2011) - Gokai Green (voice only)
Gokaiger Goseiger Super Sentai 199 Hero Great Battle (2011) - Don Dogoier/Gokai Green
Kaizoku Sentai Gokaiger the Movie: The Flying Ghost Ship (2011) - Don Dogoier/Gokai Green
Kaizoku Sentai Gokaiger vs. Space Sheriff Gavan: The Movie (2012) - Don Dogoier/Gokai Green
Kamen Rider × Super Sentai: Super Hero Taisen (2012) - Don Dogoier/Gokai Green, Kamen Rider X (voice only)
Bingo (2012) - Masaya Kumada
Tokumei Sentai Go-Busters vs. Kaizoku Sentai Gokaiger: The Movie (2013) - Don Dogoier/Gokai Green
Koi Suru Haguruma (2013) - Kenta Amagi
Busjack (2014) - Keisuke Ōtomo
Tenshi ni I'm Fine (2016) - Yūya Asahi
Kaizoku Sentai: Ten Gokaiger (2021) - Don Dogoier/Gokai Green

Video
A Day of One Hero (2011)

Stage
KEIKI ~Natsume Souseki Suirichou (2008)
La Corda D'Oro Stella Musical (2010) - Sui Midorikawa

References

External links
Official profile at Flip Up
Official blog

1990 births
21st-century Japanese male actors
Living people
People from Tokyo